Beijing Economic-Technological Development Area (BETDA) is a state-level economic and technological development zone in Beijing, China. The area is developed by Beijing ETOWN, an economic development and investment initiative of the Beijing municipal government.

It is located in Yizhuang, the southeast suburb of Beijing, with the Jingjintang Expressway nearby on its east, with the Beijing–Tianjin Intercity Rail and the Fifth Ring Road in the north and the Sixth Ring Road in the south. The pillar industries in the zone include pharmaceuticals, information technology, mechanic and electronic products and new materials. As of 2020, it had a total population of 148,145.

History 
BETDA was created in 1994, starting out as a 10 km2 plot of land in the southeast suburb of Beijing.

Administrative divisions 
In 2020, there are 2 subdistricts that falls under the direct jurisdiction of BETDA: Boxing and Ronghua.

Gallery

References

External links
 official website 

Year of establishment missing
Economic And Technological Development Area
Economic And Technological Development Area
Special Economic Zones of China
Science and technology in the People's Republic of China